Development and Liberation is the parliamentary bloc of the Amal Movement in the Lebanese Parliament. Headed by Nabih Berri, it consists of 17 deputies after the 2018 general election.

References 

Amal Movement
March 8 Alliance